"Shipoopi" is a song in the 1957 musical The Music Man by Meredith Willson. The song is sung by the character of Marcellus Washburn, a friend of con man "Professor" Harold Hill. It occurs in act 2 of the play during the dance committee's rehearsal which the town kids interrupt.

The dialogue surrounding the song does not explain the meaning of the term shipoopi, which Willson said that he invented for the song. When the high school kids want to dance, Marcellus asks which song they want to hear; Tommy Djilas replies "The Shipoopi", which seems to indicate that "shipoopi" is a dance. The chorus states that it means a "girl who's hard to get", and the first stanza says a woman who waits until the third date to kiss is "your shipoopi".

In the original 1957 Broadway production, the song was performed by actor Iggie Wolfington, who portrayed Marcellus Washburn. In the 1962 film version of The Music Man, Marcellus is played by Buddy Hackett. According to the film documentary included with the extended DVD release, choreographer Onna White was able to take Hackett, not known as a dancer, and make him into a dancer for this number.

In the 2022 Broadway revival, the lyrics for the song were altered, with new lyrics by Marc Shaiman and Scott Wittman.

In popular culture
In "Patriot Games", the 20th episode of the fourth season of the animated TV series Family Guy, Peter Griffin leads the crowd (except for Tom Brady, who guest starred as himself in the episode) in a full rendition of "Shipoopi" after he scores a touchdown as a member of the New England Patriots football team.
In the TV series LateLine, the song was featured in an episode about a false report of the death of Buddy Hackett.
Vern Fonk, an auto insurance provider in the U.S. Pacific Northwest, known for off-color and humorous commercials, uses the phrase shipoopi in his commercial "Dance".
 In Season 4, Episode 2 of Doom Patrol, the song is performed by some singing and dancing "butt monsters".

References

Songs from The Music Man
1957 songs
Songs written by Meredith Willson